Hotarele is a commune located in Giurgiu County, Muntenia, Romania. It is composed of a single village, Hotarele. Until 2004, it included Isvoarele, Teiușu, Herăști and Miloșești villages; the first two were split off that year to form Isvoarele Commune, and the second two to form Herăști Commune.

References

Communes in Giurgiu County
Localities in Muntenia